Jollifin Forest Park is a forest park in the Gambia. It covers 439 hectares.

References

Forest parks of the Gambia